Buranovka is a rural locality (a selo) and the administrative center of Buranovsky Selsoviet of Pavlovsky District, Altai Krai, Russia. The population was 827 in 2016. There are 11 streets.

Geography 
Buranovka is located between the Rogozikha and Kasmala rivers, 20 km southwest of Pavlovsk (the district's administrative centre) by road. Rogozikha is the nearest rural locality.

References 

Rural localities in Pavlovsky District, Altai Krai